The Dragon-and-Tiger Pagoda is a Tang Dynasty brick and stone pagoda located in central Shandong Province, China. It is considered a characteristic example of the pagoda style of the period.

Location 
The Dragon-and-Tiger Pagoda is located in Nanshan, near Liubu Village, in Licheng County, under the administration of Jinan City, about 33 kilometers southeast of the city of Jinan proper. The pagoda stands near the site formerly occupied by the Shentong Temple (meaning "Supernatural Power" Temple) and was erected as a burial monument to a monk. No records about the construction date of the pagoda are known to exist.

Structure 
 
The pagoda is designed in a single-storey pavilion-style with a square cross-section. The total height of the structure is  10.8 meters. The base of the pagoda consists of a three-tier Sumeru pedestal decorated with relief sculptures of lions and lotus flowers. On the pedestal rests the central pillar of the pagoda which is carved out of a single cube-shaped stone block with four meters edge length. Rectangular doors are carved into each side of the central pillar. Behind each of these doors, a carved Buddha sculpture is positioned. The top of the pagoda consists of a richly decorated brick roof. The artistic and technical design of the roof suggest that it has been rebuilt during the Song Dynasty. The pagoda is vividly decorated with alto-relievo tang-dynasty-style 
sculpture on the central pillar showing the Buddha, bodhisattvas, celestial guards, flying apsarases (on top of the doors), as well as the dragons and tigers which give the pagoda its name.

Two other pagodas stand near the Dragon-and-Tiger Pagoda: The  Four-Gates Pagoda (Sui Dynasty) and the Minor Dragon-and-Tiger Pagoda. The latter also dates from the Tang Dynasty area and - although much smaller - shares many features of the Dragon-and-Tiger Pagoda. Also in the immediate vicinity of the Dragon-and-Tiger Pagoda is the Thousand Buddha Cliff into which over 200 religious statues as well as sculptures of noble people have been carved during the Tang Dynasty.

See also 
Four Gates Pagoda
Nine Pinnacle Pagoda
Songyue Pagoda
Thousand-Buddha Cliff
List of sites in Jinan

External links
short article by the China Internet Information Center 
short article by the China Internet Information Center on the Minor Dragon-and-Tiger Pagoda 
short article about the Pagoda and the nearby thousand Buddha Cliff on ChinaCulture.org

Pagodas in China
Tang dynasty art
Major National Historical and Cultural Sites in Shandong
Buddhist temples in Shandong